Arabis procurrens, the running rockcress or spreading rock cress, is a species of flowering plant in the family Brassicaceae. It is a spreading evergreen or semi-evergreen perennial, forming a dense mat of foliage, with loose racemes of white flowers in spring, suitable for cultivation in the alpine garden.

The specific epithet procurrens means "spreading underground".

The cultivar Arabis procurrens 'Variegata', with white-edged leaves, has gained the Royal Horticultural Society's Award of Garden Merit.

This species is listed as invasive in Belgium, the Czech Republic and the United States of America.

See also 
 List of Arabis species

References

procurrens